Autalummash is a name discovered in a Hurrian text in the Hittite archive of Boghazkoy, where his name is stated as "King of Kings of Elam". He is also known as king of Tukrish. His ruling time probably was before the reign of Manishtusu king of Akkad (2306-2292 BC). Therefore, he should be contemporary with the kings of Awan dynasty.

See also
 List of kings of Persia

References

Bibliography
 Cameron, George, "History of Early Iran", Chicago, 1936 (repr., Chicago, 1969; tr. E.-J. Levin, L’histoire de l’Iran antique, Paris, 1937; tr. H. Anusheh, ایران در سپیده دم تاریخ, Tehran, 1993)
 D’yakonov, I. M., "Istoriya Midii ot drevenĭshikh vremen do kontsa IV beka de e.E" (The history of Media from ancient times to the end of the 4th century BCE), Moscow and Leningrad, 1956; tr. Karim Kešāvarz as Tāriḵ-e Mād, Tehran, 1966.

Elamite kings
Awan Dynasty